Microsoft Azure, often referred to as Azure, is a cloud computing platform operated by Microsoft that provides access, management, and development of applications and services via around the world-distributed data centers. Microsoft Azure has multiple capabilities such as software as a service (SaaS), platform as a service (PaaS) and infrastructure as a service (IaaS) and supports many different programming languages, tools, and frameworks, including both Microsoft-specific and third-party software and systems.

Azure, announced at Microsoft's Professional Developers Conference (PDC) in October 2008, went by the internal project codename "Project Red Dog", and was formally released in February 2010 as Windows Azure, before being renamed Microsoft Azure on March 25, 2014.

Services 
Microsoft Azure uses large-scale virtualization at Microsoft data centers worldwide and it offers more than 600 services.

Compute services 
 Virtual machines, infrastructure as a service (IaaS) allowing users to launch general-purpose Microsoft Windows and Linux virtual machines, as well as preconfigured machine images for popular software packages.
Starting in 2022, VMs are powered by Ampere Cloud-native processors.
 Most users run Linux on Azure, some of the many Linux distributions offered, including Microsoft's own Linux-based Azure Sphere.
 App services, platform as a service (PaaS) environment letting developers easily publish and manage websites.
Websites, Azure Web Sites allows developers to build sites using ASP.NET, PHP, Node.js, Java, or Python and can be deployed using FTP, Git, Mercurial, Team Foundation Server or uploaded through the user portal. This feature was announced in preview form in June 2012 at the Meet Microsoft Azure event. Customers can create websites in PHP, ASP.NET, Node.js, or Python, or select from several open source applications from a gallery to deploy. This comprises one aspect of the platform as a service (PaaS) offerings for the Microsoft Azure Platform. It was renamed Web Apps in April 2015.
 WebJobs, applications that can be deployed to an App Service environment to implement background processing that can be invoked on a schedule, on demand, or run continuously. The Blob, Table and Queue services can be used to communicate between WebApps,XYZ,iOS Software and WebJobs and to provide state.
 Azure Kubernetes Service (AKS) allows you to quickly deploy a production ready kubernetes cluster in Azure. Azure is responsible for managing the control plane and customers get the flexibility to choose/scale the data place (kubernetes worker nodes).

Identity 

 Azure Active Directory Connect is used to synchronize on-premises directories and enable SSO (Single Sign On). 
 Azure Active Directory B2C allows the use of consumer identity and access management in the cloud. 
 Azure Active Directory Domain Services is used to join Azure virtual machines to a domain without domain controllers. 
 Azure information protection can be used to protect sensitive information.
 Azure Active Directory External Identities are set of capabilities which allow organizations to collaborate with external users including customers and partners.

Mobile services 
 Mobile Engagement collects real-time analytics that highlight users’ behavior. It also provides push notifications to mobile devices.
 HockeyApp can be used to develop, distribute, and beta-test mobile apps.

Storage services 
 Storage Services provides REST and SDK APIs for storing and accessing data on the cloud.
 Table Service lets programs store structured text in partitioned collections of entities that are accessed by partition key and primary key. Azure Table Service is a NoSQL non-relational database.
 Blob Service allows programs to store unstructured text and binary data as blobs that can be accessed by an HTTP(S) path. Blob service also provides security mechanisms to control access to data.
 Queue Service lets programs communicate asynchronously by message using queues.
 File Service allows storing and access of data on the cloud using the REST APIs or the SMB protocol.

Communication services 
Azure Communication Services offers an SDK for creating web and mobile communications applications that include SMS, video calling, VOIP and PSTN calling, and web based chat.

Data management 
Azure Data Explorer provides big data analytics and data-exploration capabilities
Azure Search provides text search and a subset of OData's structured filters using REST or SDK APIs.
 Cosmos DB is a NoSQL database service that implements a subset of the SQL SELECT statement on JSON documents.
 Azure Cache for Redis is a managed implementation of Redis.
 StorSimple manages storage tasks between on-premises devices and cloud storage.
 Azure SQL Database works to create, scale and extend applications into the cloud using Microsoft SQL Server technology. It also integrates with Active Directory, Microsoft System Center and Hadoop.
 Azure Synapse Analytics is a fully managed cloud data warehouse.
 Azure Data Factory, is a data integration service that allows creation of data-driven workflows in the cloud for orchestrating and automating data movement and data transformation.
 Azure Data Lake is a scalable data storage and analytic service for big data analytics workloads that require developers to run massively parallel queries.
 Azure HDInsight is a big data relevant service, that deploys Hortonworks Hadoop on Microsoft Azure, and supports the creation of Hadoop clusters using Linux with Ubuntu.
 Azure Stream Analytics  is a Serverless scalable event processing engine that enables users to develop and run real-time analytics on multiple streams of data from sources such as devices, sensors, web sites, social media, and other applications.

Messaging 
The Microsoft Azure Service Bus allows applications running on Azure premises or off-premises devices to communicate with Azure. This helps to build scalable and reliable applications in a service-oriented architecture (SOA). The Azure service bus supports four different types of communication mechanisms:
 Event Hubs, which provide event and telemetry ingress to the cloud at massive scale, with low latency and high reliability. For example, an event hub can be used to track data from cell phones such as coordinating with a GPS in real time.
 Queues, which allow one-directional communication. A sender application would send the message to the service bus queue, and a receiver would read from the queue. Though there can be multiple readers for the queue only one would process a single message.
 Topics, which provide one-directional communication using a subscriber pattern. It is similar to a queue, however, each subscriber will receive a copy of the message sent to a Topic. Optionally the subscriber can filter out messages based on specific criteria defined by the subscriber.
 Relays, which provide bi-directional communication. Unlike queues and topics, a relay doesn't store in-flight messages in its own memory. Instead, it just passes them on to the destination application.

Media services 
A PaaS offering that can be used for encoding, content protection, streaming, or analytics.

CDN 
A global content delivery network (CDN) for audio, video, applications, images, and other static files. It can be used to cache static assets of websites geographically closer to users to increase performance. The network can be managed by a REST-based HTTP API.

Azure has 118 point of presence locations, across 100 cities, worldwide (also known as Edge locations) as of January 2023.

Developer 
 Application Insights
 Azure DevOps

Management 
 Azure Automation provides a way for users to automate the manual, long-running, error-prone, and frequently repeated tasks that are commonly performed in a cloud and enterprise environment. It saves time and increases the reliability of regular administrative tasks and even schedules them to be automatically performed at regular intervals. You can automate processes using runbooks or automate configuration management using Desired State Configuration.
 Microsoft SMA

Azure AI 
 Microsoft Azure Machine Learning (Azure ML) provides tools and ML frameworks for developers to create their own machine learning and artificial intelligence (AI) services.
 Microsoft Azure Cognitive Services are a set of prebuilt APIs, SDKs and customizable services for developers, including perceptual and cognitive intelligence covering speech recognition, speaker recognition, neural speech synthesis, face recognition, computer vision, OCR/form understanding, natural language processing, machine translation, and business decision services. Most AI features appeared in Microsoft’s own products and services (Bing, Office, Teams, Xbox, and Windows) are powered by Azure Cognitive Services.

Azure Blockchain Workbench 

Through Azure Blockchain Workbench, Microsoft is providing the required infrastructure to set up a consortium network in multiple topologies using a variety of consensus mechanisms. Microsoft provides integration from these blockchain platforms to other Microsoft services to streamline the development of distributed applications. Microsoft supports many general-purpose blockchains including Ethereum and Hyperledger Fabric and purpose-built blockchains like Corda.

Functions 
Azure functions are used in serverless computing architectures where subscribers can execute code as an event driven Function-as-a-Service (FaaS) without managing the underlying server resources. Customers using Azure functions are billed based on per-second resource consumption and executions.

Internet of Things (IoT) 
Azure IoT Hub lets you connect, monitor, and manage billions of IoT assets. On February 4, 2016, Microsoft announced the General Availability of the Azure IoT Hub service.
Azure IoT Edge is a fully managed service built on IoT Hub that allows for cloud intelligence deployed locally on IoT edge devices.
Azure IoT Central is a fully managed SaaS app that makes it easy to connect, monitor, and manage IoT assets at scale. On December 5, 2017, Microsoft announced the Public Preview of Azure IoT Central; its Azure IoT SaaS service.
 On October 4, 2017, Microsoft began shipping GA versions of the official Microsoft Azure IoT Developer Kit (DevKit) board; manufactured by MXChip.
 On April 16, 2018, Microsoft announced the launch of the Azure Sphere, an end-to-end IoT product that focuses on microcontroller-based devices and uses Linux.
 On June 27, 2018, Microsoft launched Azure IoT Edge, used to run Azure services and artificial intelligence on IoT devices.
On November 20, 2018, Microsoft launched the Open Enclave SDK for cross-platform systems such as ARM TrustZone and Intel SGX.

Azure Orbital
Launched in September 2020, Azure Orbital is a ground station service to help customers move satellite data to the cloud and to provide global cloud connectivity. Private industries and government agencies that use data collected by satellites can directly connect satellites to the cloud computing networks to process and analyse the data. Mobile cloud computing ground stations for customers that operate where there is no existing ground infrastructure (such as energy, agricultural and military) will provide point-to-point cloud connectivity to remote locations using third party satellite systems – SpaceX’s Starlink constellations in low Earth orbit (LEO) and SES’ O3b medium Earth orbit (MEO) constellation.

SES will be deploying satellite control and uplink ground stations for its next-generation O3b mPOWER MEO satellites alongside Microsoft's data centers to provide single-hop connectivity to the cloud from remote sites. The first two O3b mPOWER satellites launched in December 2022 (with nine more scheduled for deployment in 2023-2024) and the initial service start is expected in Q3 2023.

Microsoft suggests that satellite routing to the cloud can offer a speed advantage. For example, a connection from the home to a cloud data center for online media, entertainment or gaming, currently may use complex fibre routes that are longer than one hop up to a satellite and down again. Microsoft’s experiments using Xbox cloud have found there are parts of the world (including parts of the USA) where it is faster via satellite than over terrestrial networks.

Regional expansion 
In 2018, Azure was available in 54 regions, with 12 new regions being developed. Microsoft became the first large cloud provider that built facilities in Africa, with two regions in South Africa. An Azure geography contains multiple Azure Regions, such as for example "North Europe" (Dublin, Ireland), "West Europe" (Amsterdam, Netherlands). Where a location represents the city or area of the Azure Region. Each Azure Region is paired with another region within the same geography; this makes them a regional pair. In this example, Amsterdam and Dublin are the locations which form the regional pair.

Middle East cloud data centers 
On June 19th 2019, Microsoft announced the launch of two new cloud regions in the United Arab Emirates – Microsoft’s first in the Middle East. Microsoft's management stated that these new datacenters will empower customers and partners to embrace the benefits of the Fourth Industrial Revolution and achieve more using cloud technologies.

Research partnerships 
Microsoft has partners that sell its products. In August 2018, Toyota Tsusho began a partnership with Microsoft to create fish farming tools using the Microsoft Azure application suite for IoT technologies related to water management. Developed in part by researchers from Kindai University, the water pump mechanisms use artificial intelligence to count the number of fish on a conveyor belt, analyze the number of fish, and deduce the effectiveness of water flow from the data the fish provide. The specific computer programs used in the process fall under the Azure Machine Learning and the Azure IoT Hub platforms.

Design 
Microsoft Azure uses a specialized operating system, also called Microsoft Azure, to run its "fabric layer":  a cluster hosted at Microsoft's data centers that manage computing and storage resources of the computers and provisions the resources (or a subset of them) to applications running on top of Microsoft Azure. Microsoft Azure has been described as a "cloud layer" on top of a number of Windows Server systems, which use Windows Server 2008 and a customized version of Hyper-V, known as the Microsoft Azure Hypervisor to provide virtualization of services.

Scaling and reliability are controlled by the Microsoft Azure Fabric Controller, which ensures the services and environment do not fail if one or more of the servers fails within the Microsoft data center, and which also provides the management of the user's Web application such as memory allocation and load balancing.

Azure provides an API built on REST, HTTP, and XML that allows a developer to interact with the services provided by Microsoft Azure. Microsoft also provides a client-side managed class library that encapsulates the functions of interacting with the services. It also integrates with Microsoft Visual Studio, Git, and Eclipse.

In addition to interacting with services via API, users can manage Azure services using the Web-based Azure Portal, which reached General Availability in December 2015. The portal allows users to browse active resources, modify settings, launch new resources, and view basic monitoring data from active virtual machines and services.

Deployment models 
Microsoft Azure offers two deployment models for cloud resources: the "classic" deployment model and the Azure Resource Manager. In the classic model, each Azure resource (virtual machine, SQL database, etc.) was managed individually. The Azure Resource Manager, introduced in 2014, enables users to create groups of related services so that closely coupled resources can be deployed, managed, and monitored together. The classic model is slated to be phased out in future.

History and timeline 

In 2005, Microsoft took over Groove Networks, and Bill Gates made Groove's founder Ray Ozzie one of his 5 direct reports as one of 3 chief technology officers. Ozzie met with Amitabh Srivastava, which let Srivastava change course. They convinced Dave Cutler to postpone his retirement and their teams developed a cloud operating system.

 October 2008 (PDC LA) – Announced the Windows Azure Platform.
 March 2009 – Announced SQL Azure Relational Database.
 November 2009 – Updated Windows Azure CTP, Enabled full trust, PHP, Java, CDN CTP and more.
 February 1, 2010 – Windows Azure Platform commercially available.

 June 2010 – Windows Azure Update, .NET Framework 4, OS Versioning, CDN, SQL Azure Update.
 October 2010 (PDC) – Platform enhancements, Windows Azure Connect, improved Dev / IT Pro Experience.
 December 2011 – Traffic manager, SQL Azure reporting, HPC scheduler.
 June 2012 – Websites, Virtual machines for Windows and Linux, Python SDK, new portal, locally redundant storage.
 April 2014 – Windows Azure renamed Microsoft Azure, ARM Portal introduced at Build 2014.
 July 2014 – Azure Machine Learning public preview.
 November 2014 – Outage affecting major websites including MSN.com.
 September 2015 – Azure Cloud Switch introduced as a cross-platform Linux distribution. Currently known as SONiC
 December, 2015 – Azure ARM Portal (codename "Ibiza") released.
 March, 2016 – Azure Service Fabric is Generally Available (GA)
 September 2017 – Microsoft Azure gets a new logo and a Manifesto
 July 16, 2018 – Azure Service Fabric Mesh public preview
 September 24, 2018 – Microsoft Azure IoT Central is Generally Available (GA)
 October 10, 2018 – Microsoft joins the Linux-oriented group Open Invention Network.
 April 17, 2019 – Azure Front Door Service is now available.
 March 2020 – Microsoft said that there was a 775% increase in Microsoft Teams usage in Italy due to the COVID-19 pandemic. The company estimates there are now 44 million daily active users of Teams worldwide.

Privacy 
Microsoft has stated that, per the USA Patriot Act, the US government could have access to the data even if the hosted company is not American and the data resides outside the USA. To manage privacy and security-related concerns, Microsoft has created a Microsoft Azure Trust Center, and Microsoft Azure has several of its services compliant with several compliance programs including ISO 27001:2005 and HIPAA. A full and current listing can be found on the Microsoft Azure Trust Center Compliance page. Of special note, Microsoft Azure has been granted JAB Provisional Authority to Operate (P-ATO) from the U.S. government in accordance with guidelines spelled out under the Federal Risk and Authorization Management Program (FedRAMP), a U.S. government program that provides a standardized approach to security assessment, authorization, and continuous monitoring for cloud services used by the federal government.

Significant outages 
The following is a list of Microsoft Azure outages and service disruptions.

Certifications 

A large variety of Azure certifications can be attained, each requiring one or multiple successfully completed examinations.

Certification levels range from beginner, intermediate to expert.

Examples of common certifications include:

 Azure Fundamentals
 Azure Developer Associate
 Azure Administrator Associate
 Azure Data Engineers Associate
 Azure Security Engineer Associate
 Azure Solutions Architect Expert
 Azure DevOps Engineer Expert

Key people 
 Dave Cutler, Lead Developer, Microsoft Azure
Mark Russinovich, CTO, Microsoft Azure
 Scott Guthrie, Executive Vice President of the Cloud and AI group in Microsoft
 Jason Zander, Executive Vice President, Microsoft Azure
 Julia White, Corporate Vice President, Microsoft Azure

See also 
 Cloud-computing comparison
 Comparison of file hosting services
 Microsoft Azure Dev Tools for Teaching
 CBL-Mariner

References

Citations

Sources 

 Azure Documentation 
 Microsoft Azure

Further reading

External links 
 

Cloud computing providers
Cloud computing
Cloud infrastructure
Cloud platforms
Cloud storage
Computer-related introductions in 2010
Microsoft cloud services